Candida insectamens is a yeast species in the genus Candida.

References

insectamens